Sonja Barjaktarović (born 11 September 1986) is a retired Montenegrin handball goalkeeper. She was the first goalkeeper of the Montenegro women's national handball team and helped them to win the silver medal at the 2012 Summer Olympics. In 2011, she played in Champions League the semifinals with Budućnost. At the 2010 European Women's Handball Championship Barjaktarović finished at 6th place with the Montenegrin national team.

Club career
Barjaktarović started her handball career in Montenegrin club Berane. In 2005, she joined Budućnost with whom she won many Montenegrin Championship and Montenegrin Cup trophies. Besides winning the WRHL trophy twice, she also won the Cup Winners' Cup trophy twice - in 2006 and 2010.

Trophies
Champions League
Winner: 2011/2012
Cup Winners' Cup
Gold: 2005/2006 and 2009/2010

Women's Regional Handball League
Gold: 2009/2010, 2010/2011 and 2011/2012
Silver: 2007/2008

Montenegrin ChampionshipGold: 2005/2006, 2006/2007, 2007/2008, 2008/2009, 2009/2010, 2010/11 and 2011/2012Montenegrin Cup
Gold: 2005/2006, 2006/2007, 2007/2008, 2008/2009, 2009/2010, 2010/11 and 2011/2012
European Championship:
Winner: 2012

References

External links

Profile at site of ŽRK Budućnost
Profile at the site of Rostov-Don (in Russian)

People from Berane
1986 births
Living people
Montenegrin female handball players
Handball players at the 2012 Summer Olympics
Handball players at the 2016 Summer Olympics
Olympic handball players of Montenegro
Olympic medalists in handball
Olympic silver medalists for Montenegro
Medalists at the 2012 Summer Olympics
Montenegrin expatriate sportspeople in Russia
Montenegrin expatriate sportspeople in Turkey
Kastamonu Bld. SK (women's handball) players
Expatriate handball players in Turkey
Mediterranean Games medalists in handball
Mediterranean Games bronze medalists for Montenegro
Competitors at the 2009 Mediterranean Games